al-Ras is a Palestinian village in the Tulkarm Governorate in the eastern West Bank, located 7 kilometers South-east of Tulkarm. According to the Palestinian Central Bureau of Statistics, al-Ras had a population of approximately 506 inhabitants in mid-year 2006. In 1997, refugees made up 11.1% of the population of al-Ras. The healthcare facilities for al-Ras are based in Kafr Sur, where the facilities are designated as MOH level 2.

History
Ceramics from the Byzantine era have been found here.

Seven ruins are shown on the plan north of this village within about a mile. They are ancient watch towers, like those of Azzun.

Ottoman era
Al-Ras  was incorporated into the Ottoman Empire in 1517 with all of Palestine, and in 1596 it appeared in the  tax registers as being in the Nahiya of Bani Sa'b  of the Liwa of Nablus.  It had a population of 25 households, all Muslim. The villagers paid  a fixed tax-rate of 33,3%  on various agricultural products, including wheat, barley, summer crops, olive trees,  goats and/or beehives in addition to occasional revenues  and a fixed tax for people of Nablus area; a total of  6,600  akçe. All the revenues went to a  waqf.

In 1838,  Robinson noted  er-Ras  as a village in Beni Sa'ab district, west of Nablus.

In 1882 the PEF's Survey of Western Palestine (SWP)  described Er Ras as: "a small hamlet on a high knoll, supplied by cisterns, with olives below on the north."

British Mandate era
In the 1922 census of Palestine conducted  by the British Mandate authorities, Ras  had a population of 92 Muslims, increasing in the 1931 census to  119 Muslims, living in 26 houses.

In  the 1945 statistics  the population of Er Ras was 160 Muslims,  with  5,646  dunams of land  according to an official land and population survey. Of this, 1,029  dunams were plantations and irrigable land, 2,027 were used for cereals, while 3 dunams were built-up (urban) land.

Jordanian era
In the wake of the 1948 Arab–Israeli War, and after the 1949 Armistice Agreements, Al-Ras  came  under Jordanian rule.

In 1961, the population of Al-Ras was  269.

Post 1967
Since the Six-Day War in 1967, Al-Ras has been under Israeli occupation.

References

Bibliography

External links
 Welcome To al-Ras
Survey of Western Palestine, Map 11:    IAA, Wikimedia commons

Villages in the West Bank
Tulkarm Governorate
Municipalities of the State of Palestine